Bigor Dolenci is a village in the municipality of Kičevo, North Macedonia. It used to be part of the former Vraneštica Municipality.

Demographics
According to the 2002 census, the village had a total of 156 inhabitants. Ethnic groups in the village include:

Macedonians 156

References

Villages in Kičevo Municipality